The New Horizon College of Engineering (NHCE) is an autonomous private engineering college located near Marathahalli, in Bangalore, India. Established in 2001, the college is part of the New Horizon Educational Institution which was established in 1970.

New Horizon College of Engineering affiliated to Visvesvaraya Technological University (VTU), approved by the All India Council for Technical Education (AICTE) & University Grants Commission (UGC). It is accredited by NAAC with ‘A’ grade & National Board of Accreditation (NBA).

Department 
The college has the following departments:
Automobile Engineering
 Basic Sciences and Humanities
 Civil Engineering
 Computer Engineering
 Computer Science and Engineering
 Artificial Intelligence and Machine Learning
 Electrical & Electronics Engineering
 Electronics and Communication Engineering
 Information Science and Engineering
 Mechanical Engineering
 Master of Computer Applications
 Master of Business Administration

Administration 
Mohan Manghnani is the chairman of New Horizon Educational Institute. Manghnani is also the Managing Trustee of New Horizon Educational and Cultural Trust (1970), New Horizon Education and Agricultural Research Trust and New Horizon Educational and Research Trust. He also manages the following schools:
New Horizon Public School – Indiranagar (established 1982) 
New Horizon Pre University College – Kasturinagar (established 1982)
New Horizon College – Kasturinigar (established 2009)
New Horizon College – Marathahalli (established 1998)
New Horizon College of Engineering – Marathahalli (established 2001)
New Horizon Gurukul- Marathahalli (established 2010)
New Horizon Vidya Mandir (established 2012) 
New Horizon International School (established 2022)

Student life 
SARGAM is one of the biggest fest in Bangalore; held by NHCE. It is an annual state-level inter-collegiate cultural fest where students from the best colleges in Karnataka participate to unleash their talent to its true potential. The much-awaited SARGAM lasts for three days. The campus is hustling, bustling and nutsling with energy and students are seen rejoicing, taking their time off academics and yet learning something new at every event.

Students get to learn new skills in event management and also work on their interpersonal, communication and team-building skills. This fest was started in the year 2008 and every year it gets bigger and better. The SARGAM team at NHCE specially allocates a theme for the event each year.

2010 - Arabian Nights - 11–13 October
2011 - Retro - 23–24 September
2012 - Go Green - 5–6 October
2013 - Carnival - 27–28 September
2014 - Super Heroes - 19–20 September
2015 - Voice Out - 14–15 September
2016 - Military - 10–11 September
2017 - Extraterrestrial - 22–23 September
2018 - Krishna Leela - 28–29 September
2019 - Pancha Bhootha - 20–21 September
2022 - Rudra Factor - 25–26 November

References

Engineering colleges in Bangalore
Educational institutions established in 2001
2001 establishments in Karnataka